Shanan Kiritea Halbert (born 1982) is a New Zealand politician. As of 2020 he is a Member of Parliament in the House of Representatives for the Labour Party.

Early life and career
Halbert has affiliation to Rongowhakaata and Ngāti Whitikaupeka through his father, while his mother is pākehā. He grew up in Napier, and moved to Auckland after graduating from high school. He has a BA in education and Māori from the University of Auckland and a certificate in Contemporary Performing Arts from AUT. He started, but did not complete, an MBA. Halbert has worked at Glenfield College, where he set up the Health Sciences Academy, and at Catholic college Hato Petera. He was the Head of Relationships at Te Wānanga o Aotearoa.

Political career

Halbert stood as a list-only candidate for Labour in the 2014 general election. His party list ranking of 48 was too low to win a seat. In the 2017 general election, he sought the Labour Party selection for the  seat, losing to Helen White. He instead contested the  electorate; he neither won the electorate nor won a list seat on his party list ranking of 51. In 2018, after the resignation of Jonathan Coleman, Halbert again contested the Northcote by-election as Labour's candidate, having been chosen for the candidacy over Paul McGreal and Auckland Councillor Richard Hills. He was defeated by National's Dan Bidois.

In the 2020 general election, Halbert was again ranked 51st on the Labour party list and contested the Northcote electorate. This time, Halbert won the seat from incumbent Dan Bidois by 2534 votes.

Halbert has for years campaigned on improving public transport, as congestion in the Northcote electorate—located at the northern landing of the Auckland Harbour Bridge—is a defining issue for many voters. For the 2020 campaign, he also campaigned in support of local businesses and advocated for improved access to mental health services. His father died of lung cancer on election day.

Personal life 
Halbert is one of 13 MPs in the 2020 Parliament who identify as LGBTQI+.

References

1982 births
Living people
New Zealand Labour Party MPs
Members of the New Zealand House of Representatives
Rongowhakaata people
Unsuccessful candidates in the 2014 New Zealand general election
Unsuccessful candidates in the 2017 New Zealand general election
Candidates in the 2020 New Zealand general election
LGBT members of the Parliament of New Zealand
Gay politicians
Māori MPs
People from Napier, New Zealand
Auckland University of Technology alumni
University of Auckland alumni
Ngāti Whitikaupeka